Rachel Elizabeth Boyack is a New Zealand politician and Member of Parliament in the House of Representatives for the Labour Party.

Early life and career
For three years, Boyack was the student union president for Saniti, the student union for Nelson Marlborough Institute of Technology. Following that, from about 2012 onward, she became the Nelson organiser of First Union. Her activities have included protesting pay at supermarkets, clashing with the mayor of Nelson, Rachel Reese, and opposing the closure of a bank's branch in Stoke. In 2018 she was appointed to the board of governors of the Nelson Environment Centre and was also on the board of the Nelson Women's and Children's Refuge.

Boyack earned a Bachelor of Music degree from the University of Auckland, and was the assistant director of music at Christ Church Cathedral in Nelson.

Political career

Boyack has been a member of the Labour Party since 2005. She was selected as its candidate for the Nelson electorate in January 2017, having expressed an interest in doing so in 2015. The Nelson electorate had been held by National Party MP Nick Smith since 1996. She was also placed on the Labour party list at 48th place. She finished runner-up, but lowered Smith's majority by 9.67%.

In the 2020 general election, she was elected to the Nelson seat by a final margin of 4,525 votes, ousting the incumbent Smith.

References

Living people
Year of birth missing (living people)
New Zealand trade unionists
New Zealand Labour Party MPs
Members of the New Zealand House of Representatives
21st-century New Zealand women politicians
Women members of the New Zealand House of Representatives
University of Auckland alumni